Linda Te Puni is a diplomat from New Zealand of Māori heritage. She has served as the High Commissioner to the Cook Islands from 2010 until 2011 and Tuvalu beginning in 2016. She has also been Administrator of Tokelau.

Biography 
Te Puni is a descendant of the Te Ati Awa chief, Honiana Te Puni.

Te Puni worked several jobs before becoming a diplomat, including cutting fish in Iceland, as a farmworker in Israel and working in London's pubs.  Te Puni joined the Ministry of Foreign Affairs in 1987. She has served in places such as Honiara, Samoa, Ottawa, Mexico, Paris, Suva and Wellington.

In 2010, Te Puni moved to Rarotonga and she became the first woman to become the New Zealand high commissioner to the Cook Islands. Between 2015 and 2016, she was Administrator of Tokelau and the first woman to hold that role. In 2016, she was appointed as high commissioner to Tuvalu. In December 2018 she became ambassador to Chile.

References 

Living people
Year of birth missing (living people)
Administrators of Tokelau
High Commissioners of New Zealand to the Cook Islands
High Commissioners of New Zealand to Tuvalu
Māori politicians
Te Āti Awa people
New Zealand women ambassadors